A ghost lawyer is a lawyer who writes for other lawyers without assuming credit. Ghost lawyers often offer their services to other lawyers who need help on a project-by-project basis without wanting to take on a full associate. There are concerns about the ethics of ghost lawyers with regard to pro se litigants, but most states permit the practice.

As the number of pro se litigants is on an upward trend, attorneys have adapted their services to accommodate the trend in the form of "unbundled" legal services. In such arrangements, the attorney agrees to a limited scope representation of the client.

Notes and references

Legal ethics
Lawyers by type